The Spain women's national rugby union team played their first match on 2 May 1989, against France, losing 0-28. The team played the Women's Six Nations from 2000 to 2006, but they were replaced by Italy for 2007, in order to mirror the men's tournament.

History

Currently there are over 200 clubs in Spain and a league similar to that of male rugby. The first steps were taken in 1913, when women played in secret in schools, but rugby first began to be played seriously at training camps at the School of Architecture of Madrid in the early 70s by a group of architecture students. They formed a group of about 20 girls who trained regularly twice per week and as they were the only ones who practiced, played sided games between themselves. They played well

In the late seventies a group of female PE students taught by Jose Antonio Sancha, a professor of Rugby at Barcelona INEF, decided to train with the men's rugby and played the game seriously (though they were not recognised by the Catalan Federation rugby until 1983).

The first game was played in Barcelona between the BUC and INEF clubs and other clubs quickly formed in different parts of Spain but mainly in the early years only came from Barcelona and Madrid. In a few years female rugby spread to Madrid, the Basque Country and Valencia. In 1991 27 women's teams participating in regional competitions.

The national team first played in Cardiff (Wales) at the Rugby World Cup, where they won the fifth place behind the United States, England, France and New Zealand. In 1994, the Spanish team was unable to come to Scotland because of budgetary problems, however Spain remained one of the top teams in Europe. In 1995 Spain became the unexpected champions of the first European Championship by defeating rival France, in the final 21–6. The 1996 European brought a repeat of that final but this time the Spanish lost by 15–10.

In January 1997 a tour of England took place where Spain and were in the lead against the World Champions until 10 minutes from the end of the match. Only a last minute try by England gave them the win and in European (the first where all the British teams competed) played the final but Spain came 3rd. Spain qualified for the World Championships in Amsterdam and managed a creditable 7th place. Spain again reached the European final in 1999 against France, losing 13–5, after beating Wales (14-8) and Scotland (11-9).

The 2002 World Cup was held in Barcelona, New Zealand retaining its title in defeating (19-9) to England in the final at the Olympic Stadium Lluis Companys. France took the bronze after beating Canada (41-7), while Spain finished in 8th place after yielding to the United States (23-5).

Spain were also members of the Five and Six Nations from 2000 to 2006, finishing third on three occasions and winning 10 of the 33 games they played. However, in 2007 they were replaced by Italy because the Six Nations Committee wished to align the women's tournament with the men's. This has severely reduced Spain's opportunities to play top level international rugby, and may have been a factor in Spain's failure to qualify for the 2010 World Cup. However, they were compensated a little in 2010 when they won the "double" of the European 15s and 7s titles without losing a game.

Competitive record

Rugby World Cup

Five/Six Nations Championship

Rugby Europe Women's Championship

Overall 

(Full internationals only, updated to 16 March 2023)

Players

Recent squad
The following players were named to the squad for the 2022 Rugby Europe Women's Championship.
 Head coach: José Antonio Barrio

Previous squads

Most capped Players

See also
Spain women's national rugby sevens team
Spain men's national rugby union team

References

External links
 Federación Española de Rugby – Official Site
 Federación Asturiana de Rugby – Official Site

 
European national women's rugby union teams
National